Roger Walden (died 1406) was an English treasurer and Bishop of London.

Life

Little is now known of Walden's birth nor of his early years.  He had some connection with the Channel Islands, and resided for some time in Jersey where he was rector of the Parish Church of St Helier from 1371 to 1378.  He then held livings in Yorkshire and in Leicestershire before he became Archdeacon of Winchester in 1387. His days, however, were by no means fully occupied with his ecclesiastical duties, and in 1387 also he was appointed Treasurer of Calais, holding about the same time other positions in this neighbourhood.

In 1395, after having served Richard II as secretary, Walden became treasurer of England, adding the deanery of York to his numerous other benefices. On 8 November 1397 he was chosen Archbishop of Canterbury in succession to Thomas Arundel, who had just been banished from the realm, but he lost this position when the new king Henry IV restored Arundel in 1399, and after a short imprisonment he passed into retirement, being, as he himself says, "in the dust and under feet of men."

On 10 December 1405, through Arundel's influence, Walden was elected Bishop of London, and he died at Much Hadham in Hertfordshire on 6 January 1406. He was buried in St. Paul's Cathedral. An Historia Mundi, the manuscript of which is in the British Museum, is sometimes regarded as the work of Walden; but this was doubtless written by an earlier writer.

Citations

References

Attribution
 

1406 deaths
14th-century English Roman Catholic archbishops
Archbishops of Canterbury
Bishops of London
Archdeacons of Winchester (ancient)
15th-century English Roman Catholic bishops
Lord High Treasurers of England
Treasurers of Calais
Year of birth unknown
Jersey clergy
Burials at St Paul's Cathedral